Belgium will compete at the 2009 World Championships in Athletics from 15–23 August. A team of 23 athletes was announced in preparation for the competition. Selected athletes have achieved one of the competition's qualifying standards. The team features a women's 4 x 100 metres relay, which won medals at the 2007 World Championships, and the 2008 Beijing Olympics.

Team selection

Track and road events

Field and combined events

Results

Men
Track and road events

Field events

Women
Track and road events

Field and combined events

References

External links
Official competition website

Nations at the 2009 World Championships in Athletics
World Championships in Athletics
2009